Jovellar, officially the Municipality of Jovellar, is a 4th class municipality in the province of Albay, Philippines. According to the 2020 census, it has a population of 17,795 people.

The town was named in honor of Spanish governor-general Joaquín Jovellar y Soler.

Main access to the town is via Guinobatan. Jeepneys ply the  distance from Guinobatan to Jovellar daily with the first trip from Guinobatan leaving as early as 5 AM and the last trip to Jovellar usually at around 5 PM.

Jovellar's main industry is agriculture. Primary crops are rice, copra, abaca, and corn.

Quipia River runs through the town and the river leads all the way to Donsol in Sorsogon.

Tourist activities in the area may include a trip to the river just behind the local school or a trip to Pariaan pool. Once at the town center, one can find a statue of the national hero, Jose Rizal, and the town church in front of it.

History
In Year 1572, when the first Spanish Port was established at the western coast of the Bicol Peninsula, Christianization spread-out among the natives and paved the way for the founding of the municipality of Jovellar.

	With these developments, the native converts were emboldened to be adventurous and ventured to establish new settlements far out in the region of Bicol Peninsula. Thus, a group from west coast led by a leader popularly known as PIA, sailed upstream of Donsol River and settled in its mouth. There the people in the settlement became economically active by engaging in the gathering of all kinds of forest products like vines, resin, tar, rattan log and wildlife which were sold to dwellers in the west coast. As trade and commerce flourished, more people settled in the place which was later on named as “QUI PIA”. QUI meaning belonging to and PIA as tribute to said adventurous woman.

	Succession of political developments saw the evolution of this settlement namely:

1.	By Year 1649, this settlement was formally created as a Municipal District under the Ecclesiastical and Civil Jurisdiction of Nueva Caceres bearing the name “Distrito Municipal De Quipia”;

2.	On Year 1811, the settlement became a full-pledge town known as “Municipio De Quipia” and became part of the newly created Province of Albay by virtue of a decree of the Governor-General. The first elected Gobernadorcillo was Anastacio de la Peña with only one Year term of the office. Succession of other gobernadorcillos followed thereafter from year 1812 for several years. Through the influence of a Spanish Resident name Don Cipriano Anduiza the Governor-General by a Decree, declared the name of the place as Jovellar in honor of an illustrious Spanish Captain-General Joaquin Jovellar Y Soler, more popularly known as the father of the infamous head tax called “Cedula Personal”. The title of Gobernadorcillo was changed to “Capitan Municipal” with additional one year term of office. The following year until the end of Spanish Regime, a total of sixteen Capitanes Municipal took turns in the governance of the municipality during the period year 1863 to 1899;

3.	During the American Regime the title Capitan Municipal was replaced by “Municipal President”. Thirteen (13) Municipal President were swoon in to local leadership from year 1900 to 1941;

4.	The Japanese Occupation proved the resiliency of the people of Jovellar in repulsing this foreign domination through an organized region-wide guerilla unit-Voluntary Army of the United States of America (VAUSA) under the leadership of Mayor Leon Monilla. The Japanese Civil commission appointed Arturo C. Macandog as Town Mayor by way of establishing their own government. Vicente Macandog succeeded as Town Mayor in year 1944 after the untimely demise of Arturo C. Macandog from the hands of a guerilla fanatic;

5.	After the end of World War II, Jovellar economy was in shambles when independence was declared on July 4, 1946, where Leon C. Monilla was appointed as Mayor by the American Liberation Force. President Manuel Roxas instead appointed Jose N. Ortega as Town Mayor when civil affairs were restored in Jovellar;

6.	During the 1946 election of officials for a four year term, Jose N. Ortega was the first Mayor-elect for Jovellar during the period year 1946 to year 1949. The ensuring election of town Officials saw the rise of politics and succession of leadership in Jovellar with the likes of Tomas C. Pales (1960-1963); Jaime P. Clamar (1964-1967); re-election of Tomas C. Pales in year 1968 until year 1975 when he was succumbed to death while in Office; succession of Vice-Mayor Teodoro Mancera for the unexpired term of Mayor Pales until year 1979; and Mancera until year 1986;

7.	The historic People’s Power Revolution n year 1986 gave rise to the appointment of Jose N. Arcangel Jr. as Officer-in-Charge of the municipality. He was elected as Mayor of Jovellar during the year 1988 elections and was re-elected during the year 1992 and 1995 elections;

8.	Mayor Antonio A. Herrera succeeded during the year 1998 election, and Jose N. Arcangel Jr. has re-elected again during the year 2001 election; and

9.	Hon. Jorem L. Arcangel is now the incumbent Municipal Mayor of Jovellar on the year 2010 election by the popular will of the people.

Geography

According to the Philippine Statistics Authority, the municipality has a land area of  constituting  of the  total area of Albay.

Barangays
Jovellar is politically subdivided into 23 barangays.

Climate

Demographics

In the 2020 census, Jovellar had a population of 17,795.

Economy

References

External links
 [ Philippine Standard Geographic Code]

Municipalities of Albay